Code page 864 (CCSID 864) (also known as CP 864, IBM 00864) is a code page used  to write Arabic in Egypt, Iraq, Jordan, Saudi Arabia, and Syria.

CCSID 17248 is the euro currency update of code page/CCSID 864. The euro sign was assigned to the previously undefined code point A7hex in 1999.

Character set
The following table shows code page 864. Each character is shown with its equivalent Unicode code point.

Notes

References

864